The 1996 Tour of the Basque Country was the 36th edition of the Tour of the Basque Country cycle race and was held from 8 April to 12 April 1996. The race started in Lasarte and finished at Orio. The race was won by Francesco Casagrande of the Saeco team.

General classification

References

1996
Bas